Anthony Irvine (born 17 February 1951), also known as the Iceman and aim, is a British performance artist and visual artist.

As the Iceman, his act is to creatively melt large blocks of ice while talking to the audience over a soundtrack of tightly-looped music and sound effects. His methods of attempting to melt the ice include breath, salt and a blowtorch. He might also sing songs, make puns, attempt to release a rubber duck from inside the block of ice, or sell photographs of the ice to the audience.

In the 1980s and '90s, he performed at notable alternative comedy venues including Cluub Zarathustra and Malcolm Hardee's Tunnel Club as well as the Edinburgh Festival Fringe. In 2007, he performed at the Hackney Empire in a tribute show to the late Malcolm Hardee. In 2011 he performed at the Royal Festival Hall.

He is often cited by Stewart Lee as a legend of alternative comedy and by Jo Brand as a favourite act of the 1980s. Lee dedicates his epic poem about stand-up comedy, "I'll Only Go if you Throw Glass," to notable 1980s performers including the Iceman.

In 1995, Irvine appeared in Peter Chelsom's film Funny Bones. In the same year, he shared the Edinburgh Tapwater Award with Malcolm Hardee and Charlie Chuck.

Since 2014, he has produced art brut paintings under the name aim.

In 2022, Irvine published an ice-related children's book called Lockdown Melter.

The Iceman is the subject of a 2023 book released by Go Faster Stripe called Melt it! The Book of the Iceman.

References

External links
 Iceblocked The Iceman's official website
 
 Anthony Irvine interviewed on C86 Podcast

British comedians
British performance artists
English male comedians
Living people
Year of birth missing (living people)